Jerome Olds is an American singer-songwriter who found success in Christian music throughout the 1980s and the 1990s.

Music career
Olds' introduction to the music industry was in the Atlanta club scene during the mid-1970s, where he became a local favorite with audiences. He headlined the "Jerome Olds Band" in the 1980s, a musical outfit that was later renamed, "Tom Grose and the Varsity". Olds also ran an Atlanta recording studio, named "Southern Living At Its Finest", with bassist and producer, Ricky Keller.

Olds wrote "Trains Up in the Sky", "Again and Again" and "Jesus It's You", songs that were written for Mylon LeFevre and Broken Heart; all reached number one in the charts. Olds achieved recording success for himself with "Rejoice", "Is it Right" and "Bethlehem" reaching "Top 5" on radio. Olds wrote "Mighty Spirit" for Larnelle Harris, which was chosen by President George H. W. Bush to be the theme song for the "Points of Light" campaign. It is the longest running public service announcement (PSA) in the history of television.

"Sing Out" and "Mighty Spirit" are two Olds compositions used in Slaves, a ballet written by George Faison (choreographer for The Wiz and other films) and performed by the Alvin Ailey American Dance Theater in New York City, US. Olds also cowrote the theme song for the biographical film, Hot Shot, about the association football player, Pelé.

Religious awakening
Olds became a born-again Christian In 1987.

From 2001 to 2009, he worked as a music architect at Trinity Chapel, a church in Powder Springs, Georgia.

Books
In 2012 he released a memoir, Diary of a Crazy Christian.

Personal life
He married Freida C. Olds, "Front of House" engineer for bands like FF5. He was written up in FOH Magazine. He has three daughters-in-law. Bethany Dick Olds is a blue grass fiddle player, writer and singer with two albums who worked with Sarah Evans and Pam Tillis, she is married to Jacob Olds. Lauren Ezell Olds is a writer and singer, she is married with Solomon Olds. He has one grandson named "Cash", this is the son of Solomon and Lauren. AmiBeth Olds is a fashion buyer at Stylebiter, she is married to Joshua Olds.

Olds' twin sons, Joshua (multiple GMA Dove Award nominee) and Jacob (multiple GMA Dove Award nominee), are a musical duo, FF5. 
Olds' oldest son Solomon (GMA Dove Award winner) was also a part of the then-titled band Family Force 5 until September 23, 2013.

Discography
Lift Me Up (1980)
No Disguise (1989)
Eyes of a Common Man (1992), produced with Ricky Keller 
Fact and Reality (1994), with The Brothers 
RPM (1996), with The Brothers 
Family Man (2011) 
"This Christmas" single (2011)
Your Majesty (2011)
Your Love (2011), a three-song EP

References

External links

American performers of Christian music
Living people
Year of birth missing (living people)